The list of ship launches in 1691 includes a chronological list of some ships launched in 1691.


References

1691
Ship launches